Frederator Studios is an American animation television production studio which is a division of Frederator Networks, Inc.  It was founded by Fred Seibert in 1997 with its first series launching in 1998. (Seibert resigned from Frederator in August 2020 after 22 years and on February 23, 2021 announced a new cartoon production company, FredFilms.) The studio focuses primarily on artists who write their own shorts, series, and movies. Their slogan is "Original Cartoons since 1998." The studio has locations in New York City, where Frederator Digital is based, and Burbank, California.

History

1983–2012
Before Frederator, in 1983, Fred Seibert founded Fred/Alan, Inc. in New York City with his college friend Alan Goodman; in 1988, Fred/Alan partnered with Albie Hecht in Chauncey Street Productions to produce television programs for Nickelodeon, MTV, A&E, and CBS. The Fred/Alan firm closed down in 1992.

Seibert became the president of Hanna-Barbera Cartoons in 1992, and created What a Cartoon!, a showcase consisting of 48 shorts that aired on Cartoon Network. In 1996, when Time Warner merged with Turner Broadcasting (owner of Hanna-Barbera), he left the studio.

Frederator Incorporated was formed on January 6, 1997 (its first cartoons were released in 1998), and was housed at a temporary location of the Nickelodeon Animation Studio, in North Hollywood, California. Frederator's debut production was the cartoon short incubator, a television series called Oh Yeah! Cartoons, which later Slapstick second series: The Fairly OddParents (their first original series), as well ChalkZone, and My Life as a Teenage Robot, in addition to 51 original short cartoons by a group of creators including the first films by creators like Butch Hartman, Rob Renzetti, Tim Biskup, Larry Huber, Pat Ventura, Seth MacFarlane, and Carlos Ramos. Oh Yeah! Cartoons was based on Seibert's What a Cartoon! series of shorts from Hanna-Barbera Cartoons and Cartoon Network, which brought Hanna-Barbera its first hit series in 10 years, Dexter's Laboratory, Johnny Bravo, Cow and Chicken, I Am Weasel, The Powerpuff Girls, and Courage the Cowardly Dog. Frederator has produced a total of 16 television series, and over 200 miniseries, including webisodes. , the company was in a producing partnership with Sony Pictures Entertainment, and YouTube. 

In 2002, Frederator created a joint venture for preschoolers named Bolder Media with producer Susan Miller's Mixed Media Group, Inc. and produced their first preschool series created by Bob Boyle for Nick Jr., Wow! Wow! Wubbzy!.

Frederator Studios created a television series and competition The Nicktoons Film Festival (now known as the Nicktoons Network Animation Festival) for the Nicktoons Network, which debuted October 24, 2004.

In 2004, David Karp interned at Frederator Studios at its first Manhattan location, and built their first blogging platform. In 2007, he launched Tumblr from a rented desk at Frederator Studios' Park Avenue South offices, with chief engineer Marco Arment. Seibert was one of Tumblr's first bloggers.

On November 1, 2005, Frederator launched what it called "the first cartoon podcast." Named Channel Frederator by David Karp (who also structured and edited the initial episodes), this weekly animation network features submitted films from around the world, and quickly became one of the top video podcasts on Apple Inc.'s iTunes. In quick succession, The Wubbcast was launched for pre-schoolers in January 2006, and ReFrederator featuring vintage public domain cartoons in April 2006. Channel Frederator became the model for Seibert's media company Next New Networks and reaches almost 4,000,000 video views monthly.

On June 25, 2007 Variety article announced the studio had formed Frederator Films, dedicated to creating animated feature films budgeted under $20 million. Frederator's first feature is set up at Paramount Pictures, co-produced with J. J. Abrams' Bad Robot Productions. They have also set up their first two animated features in a first look production arrangement for Sony Pictures Animation.

The studio produced its first original internet cartoons with independent animator Dan Meth. The Meth Minute 39 launched on September 5, 2007, featuring 39 of Meth's original character shorts. (The first cartoon was "Internet People," a video on the viral video sites YouTube and MySpaceTV that featured some popular Internet memes and internet people.) A spin-off, Nite Fite, debuted in October 2008. These series have totaled over 35,000,000 video views to date.

Random! Cartoons, the latest Frederator series of short cartoon series, began airing on Nicktoons in 2009; it spawned two TV series, Fanboy & Chum Chum and Adventure Time (the first Frederator production not for Nickelodeon and the first and only series made for Cartoon Network), as well as the web series, Bravest Warriors.

2012–present
Frederator Studios became a division of parent Frederator Networks when founder Fred Seibert announced the company's new YouTube funded channel and adult production label, Cartoon Hangover in February 2012 and 18 months later started the Channel Frederator Network, a multi-channel network(MCN) dedicated to helping individual YouTube animation creators distribute and monetize their owned and operated channels. At launch, Frederator produced three animated series for Cartoon Hangover: Bravest Warriors, created by Pendleton Ward; SuperFuckers, created by James Kochalka; and Too Cool! Cartoons, an incubator featuring content from different animators. Bravest Warriors premiered on November 8, 2012 and SuperFuckers premiered on November 30, 2012.

In July 2013 as part of Too Cool! Cartoons Cartoon Hangover premiered the first part of the 10-minute short film, Bee and PuppyCat created by Natasha Allegri. Due to its popularity, in November 2013 Frederator launched a Kickstarter to fund a first season of the series, which was successful and raised $872,133 toward more episodes of the show. The project was the most funded animation and web series Kickstarter at the conclusion, and the fourth most-funded Film/Video project.

In 2013, Frederator launched a digital-only ebook company, Frederator Books. Frederator Books published its first title, "The Lieography of Babe Ruth" in March 2013.

In 2014, Frederator announced the launch of The Channel Frederator Network, a Multi Channel Network (MCN) of independently owned animation channels on YouTube. Since its start, Channel Frederator Network has generated more than one billion views, and averages more than 30 million views a month, across its network of more than 200 channels. Some of its leading channels are FilmCow (just over 1 million subscribers), Cartoon Hangover (over 1 million subscribers), and Simon's Cat (over 2,800,000 subscribers), which is YouTube's #2 animated channel. Once part of the network, Frederator handles all advertising and distribution for its channels on YouTube, promoting the show and its licensed merchandise.

As of 2016, Mexican animation studio Ánima Estudios and Frederator Studios have launched a new YouTube network, called Átomo Network, focusing on Spanish-language content.

In December 2016, Wow Unlimited Media, Inc. acquired Frederator Networks.

In August 2020, it was announced Fred Seibert would resign as CEO of Frederator Studios and Michael Hirsh would take over.

In January 2023, 50% of the rights to Bravest Warriors and Bee and Puppycat was sold to Japanese studio Toho International

Productions

Television series
For Nickelodeon:
 Oh Yeah! Cartoons (1998–2001) (co-produced with Nickelodeon Animation Studio)
 The Fairly OddParents (2001–2017) (co-produced with Nickelodeon Animation Studio and Billionfold Inc. for seasons 6–10)
 ChalkZone (2002–2008) (co-produced with Nickelodeon Animation Studio)
 My Life as a Teenage Robot (2003–2009) (co-produced with Nickelodeon Animation Studio)
 Fanboy & Chum Chum (2009–2014) (co-produced with Nickelodeon Animation Studio)

For Nick Jr.:
 Wow! Wow! Wubbzy! (2006–2010) (co-produced with Film Roman and Starz Media; produced under Bolder Media)

For Nicktoons:
 Nicktoons Film Festival (2004–2009) (co-produced with Nickelodeon Animation Studio)
 Random! Cartoons (2008–2009) (co-produced with Nickelodeon Animation Studio)
 Ape Escape (2009) (co-produced with Hawaii Film Partners, Project 51 Productions and Showcase Entertainment)

For Cartoon Network:
Adventure Time (2010–2018) (co-produced with Cartoon Network Studios)

For Teletoon:
Bravest Warriors (2017–2018) (co-produced with Nelvana)

For Netflix:
Castlevania (2017–2021) (co-produced with Powerhouse Animation Studios, Shankar Animation and Project 51 Productions)
Bee and PuppyCat: Lazy in Space (2022–present) (co-produced with OLM, Inc.)

For HBO Max:
Adventure Time: Distant Lands (2020–2021) (co-produced with Cartoon Network Studios)
Adventure Time: Fionna and Cake (TBA) (co-produced with Cartoon Network Studios)

Online series 
Channel Frederator: 
 The Meth Minute 39 (September 5, 2007)
 Cartoon Conspiracy (April 24, 2014)

Cartoon Hangover:              
 Bravest Warriors (November 8, 2012)                                      
 SuperFuckers (November 30, 2012)
 Too Cool! Cartoons (April 4, 2013) 
 Bee and PuppyCat (November 6, 2014)
 GO! Cartoons (November 7, 2017)

Amazon:
 Costume Quest (2019)

Too Cool! Cartoons

 Our New Electrical Morals created by Mike Rosenthal (April 4, 2013)
 Rocket Dog created by Mel Roach (May 2, 2013)
 Ace Discovery created by Tom Gran and Martin Woolley (May 30, 2013)
 Bee and PuppyCat (Part 1 July 11, 2013, Part 2 August 7, 2013)
 Doctor Lollipop created by Kelly Martin (September 12, 2013)
 Chainsaw Richard created by Chris Reineman (July 17, 2014)
 Dead End (June 26, 2014)
 Manly created by Jesse Moynihan and Justin Moynihan (July 31, 2014)
 SpaceBear created by Andy Helms (August 14, 2014)
 Blackford Manor created by Jiwook Kim (August 28, 2014)

GO! Cartoons
GO! Cartoons premiered on November 7, 2017. Frederator is partnering with Sony Pictures Animation for the series.
 The Summoning created by Elyse Castro (November 7, 2017)
 Boots: created by Alison & David Cowles (November 21, 2017)
 City Dwellers: created by Grant Kolton  (December 5, 2017)
 Rachel and Her Grandfather Control the Island: created by Jonni Phillips (December 19, 2017)
 Nebulous: created by Brent Sievers (January 2, 2018)
 Welcome to Doozy: created by Kate Tsang & Jennifer Cho Suhr (January 16, 2018)
 Both Brothers: created by Juris Lisovs (January 30, 2018)
 The Bagheads: created by D.R. Beitzel (February 13, 2018)
 Tyler & Co.: created by Gabe Janisz (February 27, 2018)
 Kid Arthur: created by Joel Veitch & David Shute (March 13, 2018)
 Thrashin’ USA: created by Rory Panagotopulos (March 27, 2018)
 Pottyhorse: created by Damien Barchowsky & Jeff Drake (April 17, 2018)

Television films
 Globehunters: An Around the World in 80 Days Adventure (2002, produced in 2000, co-production with Nickelodeon Animation Studio)
 The Electric Piper (2003, produced in 2000)
 Abra-Catastrophe! (2003)
 Channel Chasers (2004)
 The Jimmy Timmy Power Hour (2004/2006, co-production with O Entertainment and DNA Productions, the crossover three-part special with The Adventures of Jimmy Neutron, Boy Genius)
 Schools Out!: The Musical (2005)
 Escape from Cluster Prime (2005)
 Wubbzy's Big Movie! (2008)
 Wubb Idol (2009)
 Wishology (2009)
 A Fairly Odd Movie: Grow Up, Timmy Turner! (2011, co-production with Billionfold, Inc. and Pacific Bay Entertainment)
 A Fairly Odd Christmas (2012, co-production with Billionfold, Inc. and Pacific Bay Entertainment)
 A Fairly Odd Summer (2014, co-production with Billionfold, Inc. and Pacific Bay Entertainment)

See also 
Frederator cartoon shorts filmography
Nickelodeon Animation Studio
Cartoon Network Studios

References

External links

Frederator @ IMDB
"Fred Seibert foresees 'next golden age of animation' on Internet"   Los Angeles Times, December 18, 2013 interview (2013) 
"The Story of Kids TV Mastermind Fred Seibert: Cultivating a whole new generation of weird in animation"  Adweek interview (2013)

 
American animation studios
Adult animation studios
Television production companies of the United States
Entertainment companies based in New York City
American companies established in 1997
Entertainment companies established in 1997
Mass media companies established in 1997
Wow Unlimited Media
2016 mergers and acquisitions